Marco Sanchez is an American actor, producer, and writer.

Life and career
Sanchez studied theater throughout junior high and high school and graduated from the UCLA School of Theater, Film, and Television in 1992.

His television work includes series regular roles on Steven Spielberg's seaQuest DSV, and Walker, Texas Ranger, recurring roles on NCIS and The Client List, as well as numerous guest star appearances on shows such as 24, Desperate Housewives, ER and The Mentalist.

His film performances include Showtime's The Last Debate (directed by John Badham), Illusion (written and directed by Michael Goorjian), The Rookie (with Dennis Quaid), and most recently in Super 8 and Star Trek Into Darkness (both directed by J. J. Abrams).

In 2006, Marco co-founded Lyceum Films with actor/director Michael Goorjian, and Muse Media Center founder Noah Veneklasen. Marco’s producing credits with Lyceum include: Players' Club, 5 Wishes, The War Prayer (for which he also wrote the adapted screenplay), The Shift, and Tales of Everyday Magic.

Filmography

Film

Television

References

External links
 
 

20th-century American male actors
21st-century American male actors
American male film actors
American male television actors
Living people
Year of birth missing (living people)
Hispanic and Latino American actors